Josephine is an unincorporated community in Raleigh County, West Virginia, United States. Josephine has a post office with ZIP code 25857.

References

Unincorporated communities in Raleigh County, West Virginia
Unincorporated communities in West Virginia
Coal towns in West Virginia